Léo Roussel (born 31 August 1995) is a French racing driver who competes in the GT World Challenge Europe Endurance Cup for Emil Frey Racing.

Career

Early career
Roussel began his motorsport career at the age of 7, competing in local karting competitions in his native France. At the age of 14, in 2009, he scored second-place honors in the Bridgestone Cup and Trophée de France, alongside registering a fourth-place finish in the French Karting F3 Championship. Roussel attended the 24 Hours of Le Mans often as a child, and uncle Patrice had previously competed at Le Mans and in Grand-Am, leading Roussel to mention that his heart was set on endurance racing rather than the junior formula ladder. In 2011, he began competing in the V de V Challenge Endurance, driving a Norma M20 F for his uncle's team, Extrême Limite. Roussel would continue in the series until 2015, taking a win and two podiums throughout his five years of competition in the series.

Junior formulae
In 2012, Roussel embarked upon a dual campaign in the Formula Renault Eurocup and Formula Renault 2.0 Alps series. He would return to Formula Renault Eurocup in 2013, but it would mark his final season in single-seater competition. Across 41 races in Formula Renault 2.0, Roussel would score just 13 points, all of which were tallied in his lone season in the Formula Renault 2.0 Alps series.

Sports car racing

Prototypes
After several years of racing Group CN-level prototypes, Roussel made his debut at the 24 Hours of Le Mans in 2014, driving for Pegasus Racing in the LMP2 class. Despite suffering a heavy crash in qualifying, the team finished 10th in class, 20 laps behind the class-winning Jota Sport entry. In 2015, Roussel began competing full-time in the European Le Mans Series with Pegasus Racing. Roussel returned to the team for the 2016 season, before joining G-Drive Racing for 2017. He and co-driver Memo Rojas would go on to take the LMP2-class championship that season, finishing no lower than fourth and scoring podiums at Silverstone, the Red Bull Ring, Paul Ricard, and Spa, adding a victory at Monza. Following the European Le Mans Series season, Roussel took part in the final two races of the 2017 FIA World Endurance Championship, replacing Pierre Thiriet.

For 2018, Roussel joined CEFC TRSM Racing's Ginetta LMP1 entry into the WEC for the 2018–19 season. With the program's closure before the 2019 season, he returned to the European Le Mans Series, signing with Inter Europol Competition. However, Roussel broke his back during a practice crash at Monza, forcing him to miss the remainder of the 2019 and 2020 seasons.

GT
Roussel returned to professional motorsport in 2021, joining Saintéloc Racing in the GT World Challenge Europe Sprint Cup alongside co-driver Christopher Haase. The duo claimed two podiums, at Misano and Valencia, finishing 11th in the overall standings. For 2022, Roussel stepped up to the GT World Challenge Europe Endurance Cup, competing in the Pro class for Emil Frey Racing alongside Giacomo Altoè and Arthur Rougier. The team endured a difficult season, retiring in three of the five races and failing to score championship points.

Racing record

Career summary

* Season still in progress.

Complete GT World Challenge Europe results

GT World Challenge Europe Endurance Cup

* Season still in progress.

GT World Challenge Europe Sprint Cup

Complete 24 Hours of Le Mans results

References

External links
Léo Roussel at FIA World Endurance Championship

1995 births
Living people
French racing drivers
Formula Renault 2.0 Alps drivers
Formula Renault Eurocup drivers
24 Hours of Le Mans drivers
European Le Mans Series drivers
FIA World Endurance Championship drivers
Blancpain Endurance Series drivers
Manor Motorsport drivers
MP Motorsport drivers
G-Drive Racing drivers
Emil Frey Racing drivers
Karting World Championship drivers
DragonSpeed drivers
TDS Racing drivers
Saintéloc Racing drivers
Lamborghini Squadra Corse drivers